Tré Turner (born April 21, 2000) is an American football wide receiver for the Winnipeg Blue Bombers. He played college football at Virginia Tech.

Early life and high school
Turner grew up in Greensboro, North Carolina and attended Northwest Guilford High School, where he played basketball and football. Turner committed to play college football at Virginia Tech over offers from North Carolina and Miami (Florida).

College career
Turner played in 12 games as a freshman and caught 26 passes for 535 receiving yards and four touchdowns. He finished his sophomore season with 34 receptions for 553 yards and four touchdowns. As a junior, Turner had 34 receptions for 529 yards with three touchdowns. As a senior, Turner caught 40 passes for a team-leading 675 yards and three touchdowns. Turner finished his collegiate career with 134 receptions and 2,292 receiving yards, both fifth in school history, and 14 touchdown receptions.

Professional career

After being initially announced as one of ten undrafted free agents signed by Minnesota Vikings in 2022, Turner ultimately signed with the Las Vegas Raiders, who had offered him better terms. He was waived on May 16, 2022.

Personal life
Turner's older brother, P. J. Hairston, played college basketball at the University of North Carolina and for the Charlotte Hornets and Memphis Grizzlies of the National Basketball Association.

References

External links
Virginia Tech Hokies bio

2000 births
Living people
Players of American football from Greensboro, North Carolina
American football wide receivers
Virginia Tech Hokies football players
Las Vegas Raiders players